Scott Golder (born 17 September 1976) is a New Zealand cricketer. He played in one first-class, four List A and two Twenty20 matches for Wellington from 1998 to 2008.

See also
 List of Wellington representative cricketers

References

External links
 

1976 births
Living people
New Zealand cricketers
Wellington cricketers
Cricketers from Lower Hutt